Claus Drexel (born 24 June 1968) is a German screenwriter and film director. He has worked in France.

His first film, Affaire de famille, a comedy with  Miou-Miou, André Dussollier and Hande Kodja, was released in 2008.

In 2012 he designed a performance of the St Matthew Passion of Johann Sebastian Bach at the Cirque d'Hiver in Paris.

Drexel's film Au Bord Du Monde ("on the edge of the world"), about homeless people in Paris, was made in 2012.

Films 

 2008 : Affaire de famille
 2012 : Au bord du monde
 2018 : America
 2020 : Sous les étoiles de Paris

References 

https://variety.com/2020/film/global/claus-drexel-on-under-the-stars-of-paris-and-prostitution-documentary-the-amazons-1203473389/

French film directors
Living people
French screenwriters
1968 births